Darryl Gerard Lewis (born April 16, 1961) is a former American football tight end who played one season with the Cleveland Browns of the National Football League (NFL). He was drafted by the New England Patriots in the fifth round of the 1983 NFL Draft. He played college football at the University of Texas at Arlington and attended Daingerfield High School in Daingerfield, Texas. Lewis's brother, Gary, also played in the NFL.

References

External links
Just Sports Stats
College stats

Living people
1961 births
American football tight ends
Texas–Arlington Mavericks football players
Cleveland Browns players
Players of American football from Texas
People from Mount Pleasant, Texas